Oregon Tilth is an American nonprofit membership organization advocating organic food and farming, based in Corvallis, Oregon. Oregon Tilth's purpose is to educate gardeners, farmers, legislators, and the general public about sustainable growing practices that promote soil health, conserve natural resources, and prevent environmental degradation while producing a clean and healthful food supply.

Oregon Tilth Certified Organic (OTCO) was established in 1982 and engages in certification activities for agricultural producers, product manufacturers and other handlers of organic products. Oregon Tilth is an Accredited Certifying Agent (ACA) for the USDA's National Organic Program. Oregon Tilth Certified Organic provides organic certification of:
 Crop production
 Wild crop harvesting
 Livestock production (including beekeeping)
 Handling production (including processing, handling, marketing, restaurants, retail, fiber and textiles)

Oregon Tilth publishes a bi-monthly newspaper entitled In Good Tilth (IGT). Each issue of IGT offers informative articles covering agricultural news items relevant to both rural producers and urban consumers. Regular features include yard and garden tips, OTCO certified farmer or processor profiles; research updates and news; classified ads and a calendar of upcoming events. Since 2004, IGT has featured several articles translated into Spanish.

The OTCO Program offers assessment for compliance with several different organic certification standards. Some certification standards are established and enforced via government regulations, such as the USDA National Organic Program standards (7 CFR Part 205), the European Organic Program (EEC 2092/91), and the Canadian Organic Regime. Other organic standards are established by industry working groups, such as the Global Organic Textile Standard (GOTS).

Failed merger with CCOF
In the summer of 2012, a proposed merger between Oregon Tilth and California Certified Organic Farmers (CCOF) proved controversial and was met with significant opposition from both membership bodies, including OTCO's founders and long-term members of CCOF. On Saturday, September 29, at Oregon Tilth’s membership meeting in Portland, Oregon, a proposal to rename Oregon Tilth as CCOF Tilth Foundation, revise bylaws, and transfer ownership of the certification program, was presented to the membership. On October 3, 2012, Moss Adams LLP, the independent CPA firm hired to perform the voting procedure and ballot count, released the verified voting results. While a majority of members (61%) voted in favor of the proposal, it failed to achieve the two-thirds vote necessary for passage.

See also
Washington Tilth Association

External links

Information on the OTCO program from the Consumer Union
Oregon Tilth entry at ecolabelling.org

Agriculture in Oregon
Agricultural organizations based in the United States
Non-profit organizations based in Oregon
Organic farming in the United States
Organic farming organizations
Organizations based in Salem, Oregon
Environmental organizations established in 1974
1974 establishments in Oregon